Lisbon is an unincorporated community in Howard County, in the U.S. state of Missouri.

History
A post office called Lisbon was established in 1871, and remained in operation until it was discontinued in 1906. The community was named after Lisbon, Portugal.

References

Unincorporated communities in Howard County, Missouri
Unincorporated communities in Missouri